Hit Tine is a 2019 Burmese drama film starring Eaindra Kyaw Zin, May Than Nu, Pyae Pyae, and Mone. The film, produced by Nandaewei Film Production premiered in Myanmar on May 16, 2019.

Cast
Eaindra Kyaw Zin as Daung Ni
Pyae Pyae as Eu Daung Nge
May Than Nu as Daw Thin Thin Khat
Mone as Zin Mar Lin
Phyo Pa Pa Htoo as Thin Ya Nant

References

External links

2019 films
2010s Burmese-language films
Burmese drama films
Films shot in Myanmar